Crassula capitella, (red flames, red pagoda or campfire plant) is a perennial succulent plant native to southern Africa.

Description

An extremely variable species. The narrow, pointed, splayed ("propeller-like") leaves are initially a light green, but become a strong reddish colour in the sun. 

The leaves are stacked, and near the base of the rosette they are larger. Near the top of a rosette, the leaves gradually get smaller and change into floral bracts, as the stem forms a long, pointed inflorescence.

It is a small, succulent herb (15-40 cm in height) - with stems that are either erect or rambling and mat-forming. Each stem forms roots at its internodes, which take root if the stem lies against the ground. 

C.capitella is mostly biennial, blooming in the summer, with small, white, star-shaped flowers forming all around each thick, upright stem.

It grows to a height of about 6 inches tall, and will be damaged when exposed to temperatures below .<ref name="smgrowers">[http://www.smgrowers.com/products/plants/plantdisplay.asp?strSearchText=Crassula%20capitella&plant_id=461 San Marcos Growers: Crassula capitella Campfire (Campfire Crassula)] . accessed 5.7.2013</ref>

CultivationCrassula capitella prefer full sun to partial shade, average watering needs, and shouldn't be exposed to temperatures below . It may suffer from foliage edema, which may be the result of rapid changes in moisture.

DistributionCrassula capitella is native to southern Africa; it is found in Transvaal, Free State, Eastern Cape, and in some parts of southern Namibia and Botswana.

SubspeciesCrassula capitella subsp. capitella: biennial basal rosette with smooth (hairless) stems and unbranched spike inflorescence.  Crassula capitella subsp. enantiophyllaCrassula capitella subsp. meyeri: a decumbent subspecies from the sandy coastline of KwaZulu-Natal  Crassula capitella subsp. nodulosa: a perennial shrub with one or two rosettes on hairy stems.  Crassula capitella subsp. sessilicymula: a perennial shrub (40cm) with a woody trunk and branched inflorescence.  Crassula capitella subsp. thyrsiflora: a perennial shrub with multiple pinkish-red rosettes, that become stacked in a pagoda form ("red pagoda") and an unbranched spike inflorescence. From the Western Cape ProvinceCrassula capitella subsp. corymbulosa.''

References

capitella
Plants described in 1778